Michael McGinley (born 1852 in Donegal, Ireland) was an Irish songwriter famous for the songs "The Hills of Glenswilly" and "An Emigrant's Farewell", written as he travelled on the ship The Invercardill to New Zealand in 1878.

Having returned to Ireland, he married Bridget McDevitt in 1901. One of their children was Nora, a republican socialist and activist. They first farmed a small holding at Breenagh, but later leased a pub in Strabane, County Tyrone, and then moved to Ballybofey, County Donegal. He wrote the ballad The woods of Drumboe (aka The Drumboe martyrs) to memorialist the four anti-treaty republicans who were executed in Drumboe on 14 March 1923.

He is the older brother of Peadar Toner Mac Fhionnlaoich, an Irish language writer.

References

External links
Lyrics - The Hills of Glenswilly
Lyrics - An Emigrant's Farewell
Lyrics - The Drumboe Martyrs

1852 births
Year of death missing
Irish songwriters
Musicians from County Donegal